Dykeman's was a station on the Harlem Line of the New York Central Railroad (now Metro-North Railroad). It was 55 miles from Grand Central Terminal.

History 
Rail service in Dykeman's can be traced as far back as 1848 with the establishment of the New York and Harlem Railroad, which became part of the New York Central and Hudson River Railroad in 1864 and eventually taken over by the New York Central Railroad.  Dykeman's was also the northern terminus of double tracks on the Harlem Line which were controlled by "Signal Station X" until 1948. The station house was replaced by a small shelter on August 6, 1961, and was closed when the New York Central merged into Penn Central in 1968. No station structures remain at the site, which the MTA replaced with Brewster North Railroad Station in 1980.

Bibliography

References

Former New York Central Railroad stations
Former railway stations in New York (state)
Railway stations in Putnam County, New York
Railway stations in the United States opened in 1848
Railway stations closed in 1968
Transportation in Putnam County, New York